Henry Folliott, 1st Baron Folliott (1568–1622) was an English soldier in the Irish army. He fought in the Nine Years' War and then in the suppression of O'Doherty's rebellion at the Siege of Tory Island.

Birth and origins 
Henry was born in 1568, the second son of Thomas Folliott and his wife Katherine Lygon. His father was esquire of Pirton Court, Pirton, Worcestershire. His father's family was a cadet branch of the baronial family of Foliot that had been established in England at the Norman conquest in 1066.

Henry's mother was his father's second wife. She was a daughter of William Lygon of Madresfield Court in Malvern, Worcestershire.

Marriage and children 
Folliott married Anne Strode, daughter of Sir William Strode of Stoke-sub-Hamdon, Somerset.

 
Henry and Anne had five sons:
 Thomas (1613–1697), his successor
 Michael Folliott (d. 17 November 1638)
 Arthur, died young
 Henry, died childless
 Charles (died after 1621)

—and two daughters:
 Frances (died 1638), married Sir Robert King MP of Boyle Abbey, and had issue including John King, 1st Baron Kingston and Sir Robert King, 1st Baronet
 Elizabeth, married firstly on 7 May 1640 Richard Wingfield and had issue Folliott Wingfield, 1st Viscount Powerscourt; she married secondly on 12 April 1646 Edward Trevor; she married thirdly Sir John Ponsonby (d. 1678) and had issue including William Ponsonby, 1st Viscount Duncannon.

Nine Years' War 
He came to Ireland and served the Crown during the Nine Years' War (Ireland) (1594–1603). in 1599 he was knighted by Robert Devereux, 2nd Earl of Essex. He commanded a regiment under Lord Mountjoy in 1601 at the Battle of Kinsale. In 1603 he was commissioned to develop a township adjacent to Ballyshannon Castle in the south of County Donegal, Ulster. In 1608 he commanded troops in the suppression of O'Doherty's rebellion and successfully captured or killed some of the rebels during the Siege of Tory Island. The parliamentary borough of Ballyshannon (Parliament of Ireland constituency) was incorporated in 1613 just before the Irish Parliament of 1613–1615.

Later life and death 
He was created Baron Folliott, of Ballyshannon in the County of Donegal, in the Peerage of Ireland on 22 January 1620. His residence was Wardtown Castle, Ballymacaward, Ballyshannon, County Donegal.

Folliott died on 10 November 1622 and was succeeded by his eldest son Thomas as the 2nd Baron Folliott. His widow married Robert Dillon, who was then styled "Baron Dillon of Kilkenny-West" as the heir of the 1st Earl of Roscommon. She was his third wife and had further issue by him, including Carey Dillon, 5th Earl of Roscommon. She died c. 1650.

Notes and references

Notes

Citations

Sources 
 
 
  – Eardley of Spalding to Goojerat
  – Knights bachelors & Index

 
 

1568 births
1622 deaths
17th-century Anglo-Irish people
Barons in the Peerage of Ireland
Peers of Ireland created by James I
People from Worcester, England
People of Elizabethan Ireland
People of O'Doherty's rebellion
People of the Nine Years' War (Ireland)